The West Kettle River is a tributary of the Kettle River in the Canadian province of British Columbia. It is part of the Columbia River basin, as the Kettle River is a tributary of the Columbia River.

Course
The West Kettle River originates in St Margaret Lake the mountains east of Kelowna, near Jubilee Mountain. The river flows generally south, joining the Kettle River near the community of Westbridge.

See also
List of British Columbia rivers
Tributaries of the Columbia River

References

Rivers of British Columbia
Tributaries of the Columbia River
Similkameen Division Yale Land District